Joey David Vickery (born 9 June 1967) is a Canadian former professional basketball player. At a height of 1.78 m (5'10") tall, he played at the point guard position. He was the Lithuanian Basketball League's LKL All-Star Game Three-point Shootout Champion, in 1995. He last played for the Austrian basketball club Mattersburg Rocks.

College career
Born in Winnipeg, Manitoba, Canada, Vickery graduated Westwood Collegiate in 1985, and played for the Brandon University Bobcats, for three seasons. After a successful debut, in which Brandon University won the Canadian National Championship in 1989, Vickery was named the Jack Donahue MVP award winner. Vickery was also named a 1st team All-Canadian, at Brandon University, in 1990 and 1991.

Professional career
After college, Vickery moved to Europe, and he played for the now defunct Olimpas Plungė of Lithuania. He averaged 23.4 points and 3.3 rebounds per game. He also played for various clubs in Spain, like Huelva, Algeciras, and Melilla, and then moved to the Austrian club Mattersburg 49ers. After yet another successful season, he moved to Sweden's Jamtland Basket KFUM. In 2005, he returned to Austria, and signed a contract with his previous team.

Clubs 
  The Rogues, SIT, Scobey, MT 1995
  Olimpas Plungė (1995–1996) 
  Ciudad de Huelva, Spain (1996–1997)
  Poissy Chatou Basket (1997–2000)
  Algeciras, Spain (2000–2001)
  Mattersburg 49ers (2001–2002)
  Ciudad de Huelva, Spain (2002–2003)
  Jamtland Basket KFUM (2003–2004)
  Melilla, Spain (2004–2005)
  Mattersburg 49ers (2005–2006)
  Arkadia Traiskirchen Lions (2005–2008)
  Mattersburg Rocks, Austria (2008–2017)

National team

Canadian university national team
Vickery played on two world university teams for Canada, first at the 1989 Duisburg, Germany Games, and in 1991, at the Sheffield, England Games. Canada finished 4th at the 1989 Duisburg Games, and won a silver medal at the games in Sheffield, England.

Canadian senior national team
Vickery was a member of the senior Canada national men's basketball team, at the 1995 Tournament of the Americas, and the 1997 Tournament of the Americas. He also appeared internationally in the 1994 FIBA World Championship, in Toronto, and the 1998 FIBA World Championship, in Athens. In 1994, Vickery was named the MVP of the Berlin Cup friendly tournament, after making 17 out of 20 three point field goal attempts during the tournament. The participating teams at the tournament were Canada, Russia, Germany, and Italy.

References

External links
Eurobasket.com Profile

1967 births
Living people
Basketball players from Winnipeg
Brandon Bobcats basketball players
Canadian expatriate basketball people in France
Canadian expatriate basketball people in Spain
Canadian expatriate basketball people in Sweden
Canadian expatriate basketball people in Austria
Canadian expatriate basketball people in Lithuania
Canadian men's basketball players
Expatriate basketball people in Austria
Melilla Baloncesto players
Point guards
1998 FIBA World Championship players
1994 FIBA World Championship players
Traiskirchen Lions players